Lantana is a town in Palm Beach County, Florida, United States. It is 37 miles north from Fort Lauderdale. This town is part of the Miami metropolitan area. The population was 10,423 at the 2010 United States Census.

History

The first settlers came to the area after Congress passed the Armed Occupation Act of 1842 at the end of the Seminole Wars during the Administration of President John Tyler. The M.B. Lyman family is credited with founding the town. Lyman arrived with his family in 1888 and within a year started several enterprises including a general store, Indian Trading Post and a post office. As postmaster, Lyman named the post office – Lantana Point – for the wild Lantana plants that grew in abundance in the area. The word Point was later dropped.

One of the other Lyman businesses was the Lantana Fish Company. In the early 1900s the gathering and marketing of oysters became the town's leading industry. The Town of Lantana was incorporated on July 20, 1921, with 22 residents voting in the first election. At the time of incorporation, the area of Lantana was one square mile with a population of 100 residents.

After World War II, Lantana, like the rest of South Florida experienced a tremendous building boom which continues to this day. Interstate 95, which was completed through Lantana in the mid-1970s, brought a surge of commercial development to the town.

Since 1950, the town was the home of the A. G. Holley Hospital the last of the old state-run sanitariums for patients with tuberculosis. The facility treated about fifty patients at a time, those with the most obdurate forms of the disease. The facility was demolished in November 2014.

From 1974 until 1988, Lantana was home to the tradition of hosting the largest decorated Christmas tree in the world.  Every year, a huge tree would be shipped from the Pacific Northwest to Lantana by rail to the grounds of the National Enquirer, adjacent to the Florida East Coast Railway tracks.  The event would attract many visitors every night, and grew to be one of the most spectacular and celebrated holiday events in South Florida.  This annual festivity ended in 1989 due to the  sale of the National Enquirer following the death of its founder Generoso Pope Jr. at age of 61 in October 1988.

Geography

Lantana is located at  (26.582797, –80.057587).

Climate

Lantana has a tropical climate, more specifically a tropical rainforest climate (Köppen climate classification Af), as its driest month (February) averages 64.8mm of precipitation, meeting the minimum standard of 60mm in the driest month needed to qualify for that designation. Much of the year is warm to hot in Lantana, and frost is extremely rare. As is typical in the Miami metropolitan area, there are two basic seasons in Lantana, a mild and dry winter (November through April), and a hot and wet summer (May through October). Daily thundershowers are common in the hot season, though they are brief. The town of Lantana is home to many varieties of tropical vegetation, which can be seen in its variety of plants, trees, and flowers all over South Florida and the town itself, including its namesake, the lantana flower.

Demographics

2020 census

As of the 2020 United States census, there were 11,504 people, 4,529 households, and 2,492 families residing in the town.

2010 census

As of the census of 2010, there were 5,186 households, out of which 18.8% were vacant. In 2000, the population 6.1% was under the age of 5, 21.4% was under the age of 18, and 13.8% were 65 years of age or older. The median income for a household in the town was $41,624.  About 17.4% of the population was below the poverty line.

2000 census

As of 2000, English as a first language accounted for 73.24% of all residents, while Spanish was found to be the first language of 13.95%, French Creole made up 6.82%, and Finnish was the mother tongue of 5.01% of the population (the highest percentage in Florida.) Also, French was spoken by 0.62% of residents and German was spoken by 0.34% of the populace.

As of 2000, Lantana had the 111th highest percentage of Finns in the US, which accounted for 5.4% of all residents (tied with two US areas in Michigan,)
 while Haitians had the thirty-fifth highest percentage, with 5.20% of the population.

Culture

Lantana was the publishing headquarters of the National Enquirer tabloid newspaper during the 1970s and much of the 1980s.

The Town of Lantana has a public library, with a collection of more than 24,000 volumes, as of 2020. The Lantana Road Library west of the city in unincorporated Palm Beach County is a branch of the public Palm Beach County Library System.

Education

Public Elementary Schools
Lantana Elementary School
Starlight Cove Elementary
Barton elementary

Public Middle Schools
Lantana Community Middle School

Public High School
Santaluces Community High School

Public Charter School
Palm Beach Maritime Academy (Grades K–12)

Special Needs School
Royal Palm School (Grades K–12)

Religion

 First Baptist Church ("FBC Lantana") is a Southern Baptist Church in Lantana. The church covers traditional Protestant beliefs of the Baptist doctrine and is located at 1126 West Lantana Road
 Holy Spirit Catholic Church is a church of the Catholic faith located in Lantana at 1000 West Lantana Road.
 Living Word Church is a non denominational church located at 2116 west Lantana Road in Lantana.
 Maranatha Bible Church is a non denominational church located in Lantana at 900 South Broadway.
 Holy Guardian Anglican Church is an Episcopalian church located at 1325 Cardinal Lane in Lantana.
 Chabad of South Palm Beach, a Chabad house for disseminating Orthodox Judaism and supporting Jewish community life, is located at 224 South Ocean Boulevard, Lantana.

Sister cities

 Lapua, Finland

Notable people

 Artine Artinian, literature scholar
 Lori Berman, member of the Florida State Senate
 Clifford L. Linedecker, author
 Kathleen Ridder, philanthropist, educator, writer, equality for women activist
 Paul Shannon, radio announcer

References

External links

Lantana official website
 Lantana Public Library official website

Towns in Palm Beach County, Florida
Towns in Florida
Populated coastal places in Florida on the Atlantic Ocean
1921 establishments in Florida
Populated places established in 1921